Ayumi Morita was the defending champion, but withdrew in the quarterfinals because of a right knee injury.
Kristina Mladenovic won the title, defeating Chang Kai-chen 6–4, 6–3 in the final.

Seeds

Draw

Finals

Top half

Bottom half

References
 Main Draw
 Qualifying Draw

OEC Taipei WTA Ladies Open - Singles
Taipei WTA Ladies Open